Piero Aggradi (7 October 1934 in Turin – 17 July 2008 in Pescara) was a professional Italian football player.

External links

1934 births
2008 deaths
Footballers from Turin
Serie A players
Juventus F.C. players
A.C. Monza players
Palermo F.C. players
A.C. Cesena players
Casale F.B.C. players
Association football midfielders
Italian footballers